Daniel Stoian (born 21 April 1967) is a Romanian sprint canoer who competed from the late 1980s to the late 1990s. He won four medals at the ICF Canoe Sprint World Championships with a gold (K-2 1000 m: 1986), two silvers (K-2 200 m: 1994, 1995), and a bronze (K-2 10000 m: 1986).

Stoian also competed in three Summer Olympics, earning his best finish of fifth twice (K-2 500 m: 1988, K-4 1000 m: 1992).

References

1967 births
Canoeists at the 1988 Summer Olympics
Canoeists at the 1992 Summer Olympics
Canoeists at the 1996 Summer Olympics
Living people
Olympic canoeists of Romania
Romanian male canoeists
ICF Canoe Sprint World Championships medalists in kayak